The relations between Pope Pius X and Russia were difficult, and the situation of Polish Catholics in Russia did not improve.

Religious freedom decrees in 1903 and 1905
Tsar Nicolas issued a decree on 22 February 1903, promising religious freedom for the Catholic Church, and, in 1905, promulgated a constitution, which included religious freedom.

Opposition to the Mariavites
A religious movement supported and financed by Russia, the Mariavites, began to gain ground among Polish Catholics, although the Pope had condemned it in 1907. In his encyclical Tribus circiter Pope Pius wrote to the episcopate, warning against national radicals and asking for peace and order.

1907 agreement
In 1907, Pius X signed an agreement that prescribed mandatory Russian history and literature courses in Catholic seminaries in Polish Russia in exchange for greater rights for Catholics.

Ea Semper
The publication of the Apostolic Letter Ea Semper, which dealt with the Eastern Rite Catholics in the United States, led to a number of defections to the Russian Orthodox Church in America.

Feeling betrayed by Russia
Toward the end of his life, Pius X felt betrayed by Russia, which had not eased the conditions of Polish Catholics. At his last public reception of the Diplomatic Corps, he publicly told the Russian ambassador, Aleksandr Nelidov:
We will not accept greetings or congratulations from Russia, which did not keep a single promise to us or to the Catholics in Russia.
As the surprised ambassador disagreed, the Pope rose from his throne and asked the ambassador to leave the room.

References

Bibliography
Acta Apostolicae Sedis ( AAS), Roma, Vaticano 1922-1960
L. Boudou, Le S. Siege et la Russie, Paris, 1890 
Owen Chadwick, The Christian Church in the Cold War, London 1993 
, VII, Herder Freiburg, 1979, 355-380

Pope Pius X
Holy See–Russia relations
Russian Empire